Paluma may refer to:

Places in Queensland, Australia
 Paluma, Queensland, a township
 Paluma Dam, part of the water supply system for the city of Townsville
 Paluma Important Bird Area

Ships
 HMAS Paluma, various ships of the Royal Australian Navy
 Paluma class survey motor launch, four hydrographic survey launches of the Royal Australian Navy

See also
 Paluma Range National Park, Queensland
 Paloma (disambiguation)